Alleine is a surname. Notable people with the surname include:

 Joseph Alleine (1634–1668), English Puritan Nonconformist pastor and author
 Richard Alleine (1611–1681), English Puritan divine

See also
 "Alleine zu zweit" ("Alone Together"), a single by German/Finnish duo Lacrimosa released in 1999
 Alan (disambiguation)
 Alen (given name)
 Allan (disambiguation)
 Allen (disambiguation)